The 2016–17 Liiga season was the 42nd season of the Liiga (formerly SM-liiga), the top level of ice hockey in Finland, since the league's formation in 1975.

Teams

Regular season
The top six teams advance directly to the quarter-finals, while teams placing 7th through 10th play in the wild-card round for the final two spots. The Liiga is a closed league and there is no relegation.

Rules for classification: 1) Points; 2) 3-point wins 3) Goal difference; 4) Goals scored; 4) Head-to-head points.

Playoffs

Bracket

Wild card round (best-of-three)

(7) Ässät vs. (10) Ilves 

Ilves wins the series 2-1.

(8) Kärpät vs. (9) HIFK 

HIFK wins the series 2-0.

Quarterfinals (best-of-seven)

(1) Tappara vs. (10) Ilves 

Tappara wins the series 4-3.

(2) TPS vs. (9) HIFK 

HIFK wins the series 4-2.

(3) KalPa vs. (6) Pelicans 

KalPa wins the series 4-1.

(4) JYP vs. (5) HPK 

JYP wins the series 4-3.

Semifinals (best-of-seven)

(1) Tappara vs. (9) HIFK 

Tappara wins the series 4-1.

(3) KalPa vs. (4) JYP 

KalPa wins the series 4–3.

Bronze medal game

Finals (best-of-seven) 

Tappara wins the finals 4–2.

Final rankings

References

Liiga seasons
Liiga
Liiga